Deac McCaskill (born September 26, 1977) is an American professional stock car racing driver from Raleigh, North Carolina. He currently drives the No. 08 Puryear Tanklines Chevrolet in the Late Model Stock class at South Boston Speedway in Virginia.

Early years
McCaskill began race car driving at age 12 at the Wake County Speedway in Raleigh, North Carolina. In his first start, he finished 10th out of 28 Cars. He would eventually win his first race in his 6th start at the bullring. At the age of 16, he became the youngest winner in the Limited Late Model class in his first start at Southern National Raceway Park in Kenly, North Carolina. At 18 years old, McCaskill won his first Late Model Stock race at Orange County Speedway, and then finishing 2nd in points that year. Later that year, McCaskill qualified on the pole out of 128 cars at the Richmond International Raceway, and followed that up with a 5th-place finish.

Professional career
In 2000, McCaskill was once again a bridesmaid with a second-place finish in points at Orange County Speedway. He won 4 races that year to make his career total 50 by the time the year was over. In 2001 and 2002, McCaskill had 2 wins and a 7th and 3rd-place finish in points at Orange County Speedway. The 2003 season brought 6 wins in 13 starts at Orange County Speedway, as well as a 4th-place finish at Martinsville Speedway.

In 2004, McCaskill won the LMSC Championship at Southern National Speedway, and had a 4th-place finish in the UARA Race at Bristol Motor Speedway. In 2005, McCaskill returned to Bristol and nabbed a 2nd-place finish. He made 10 more starts in the UARA Series in 2005 and got 2 wins. In 2006, McCaskill outran NASCAR Nextel Cup Series star Denny Hamlin at Southern National Speedway's annual event, the Thanksgiving Classic. He also won the 2006 track championship at Southern National.

2007 saw McCaskill's first ever NASCAR start in the Busch Series at Indianapolis Raceway Park. Driving the No. 9 Puryear Tank Lines Dodge for Evernham Motorsports, McCaskill started 42nd and worked his way up the top 10 using pit strategy. He eventually led 5 laps and was the highest running non cup driver, in 8th place, until Steve Wallace wrecked him on lap 153. In 2008, McCaskill finished 3rd in the Late Model Stock points at South Boston Speedway.

Motorsports career results

NASCAR
(key) (Bold – Pole position awarded by qualifying time. Italics – Pole position earned by points standings or practice time. * – Most laps led.)

Busch Series

References

External links
 Official Website
 

1977 births
Living people
NASCAR drivers
Racing drivers from North Carolina
Sportspeople from Raleigh, North Carolina
Evernham Motorsports drivers